Bersuit Vergarabat is an Argentine rock band that formed formally in 1987.

History 
The previous name of the band (from 1987 to May 1989) was Henry y la Palangana. By the end of 1989, the band had changed name several times, adopting nonsensical names like "Ernios of arcabio", "Aparrata Vergi", "Seria Soneub" (Buenos Aires spelled backwards); but eventually settled on "Bersuit Vergarabat Van de ir" then keeping only "Bersuit Vergarabat" its most iconic name.

After two albums of underground transgressor rock, the band began to experiment with Latin American rhythms such as cumbia, chacarera, candombe and cuartetazo. The lyrics, though, remained acid and critical with regard to political and social problems.

The current formation is Alberto Verenzuela (vocals, guitar, harmonica), Daniel Suárez (vocals), Germán Sbarbati (vocals, charango), Juan Subirá (keyboards, accordion, vocals), Pepe Céspedes (bass, vocals, guitar) and Carlos Enrique Martín (drums, percussion); previous members include: Gustavo Cordera (vocals), Charly Bianco (guitar, vocals), Marcela Chediak (percussion), Rubén Sadrinas (vocals) and  Oscar Righi (guitar).

In honor of Buenos Aires's José Tiburcio Borda Psychiatric Hospital, the band often performs in clinical pajamas. Although there is no truth to the urban legend of Cordera spending some time in that institution, the band has demonstrated an affinity for everything related to madness and marginalization.

In addition to finding success in the Buenos Aires' underground movement, and then nationwide, Bersuit Vergarabat has attracted fans from many countries in Latin America as well as Spain and United States.

The band's success beyond Latin America hinges largely on their ability to constantly reinvent themselves, as with their late 1990s venture into reggae music, popular in the United States at the time.

One of the band's signature songs, «El tiempo no para» from their album Y Punto, is a cover of "O Tempo não Pára" by the Brazilian musician Cazuza. In his honor, Gustavo Cordera sings one of the song's verses in the live version in Portuguese.

After having success in several countries, the band broke up in 2009, due to Cordera's embarkation on a solo career.  They returned to the stage three years later without their original singer. Since then, Bersuit released 3 studio albums, La Revuelta (2012), El Baile Interior (2014), La Nube Rosa (2016). This new material consolidated Condor Sbarbati and Daniel Suarez as main singers.

Members

Discography

Studio albums
1992 - Y Punto
1993 - Asquerosa Alegría
1996 - Don Leopardo
1998 - Libertinaje
2000 - Hijos del Culo
2004 - La Argentinidad al Palo - Se Es, Lo Que Se Es (Double)
2005 - Testosterona
2006 - Bersuit
2007 - ?
2012 - La Revuelta
2014 - El Baile Interior
2016 - La Nube Rosa

Live albums
2002 - De la Cabeza

Compilations
2006 Bersuit - (CD/DVD)
2006 Lados BV - (Rarities)

Awards

External links

Band website
 
Bersuit Vergarabat on Twitter
Bersuit Vergarabat Facebook page
Bersuiteros.com (Fansite)

Argentine rock music groups
Latin music groups
Musical groups established in 1987